Succinella oblonga is a species of air-breathing land snail, a terrestrial pulmonate gastropod mollusc in the family Succineidae. 

Succinella oblonga is the type species of the genus Succinella.

Description
The shell is c. 8 mm in height and  up 4.5 mm wide. It has 3 to 3½ strongly arched whorls which are set off from each other by a deep suture. The last whorl is highly inflated, the aperture height occupying about half of the total height. The shell is dextral and relatively thick-walled. The shell is opaque, the surface is matte. The surface is rough and bears somewhat irregular growth bands. Often the surface layer is camouflaged with dirt or droppings. The animal is mostly grey in colour.

The shell closely resembles that of Catinella arenaria These two  species are separated  by anatomical differences: long penis with epiphallus, long vas deferens and no black spot at the insertion of retractor at penis.

Distribution
This species lives in a number of countries and islands including:
 Latvia
 Bulgaria
 Slovakia
 Poland
 Czech Republic
 Ukraine
 Netherlands
 Great Britain
 Ireland

References

 Andreae A. (1884). Der Diluvialsand von Hangenbieten im Unter-Elsass, seine geologischen und palaeontologischen Verhältnisse und Vergeich seiner Fauna mit der recenten Fauna des Elsass. Abhandlungen zur geologischen Specialkarte von Elsass-Lothringen. 4 (2): Tit. + 81 pp.
 Bank, R. A.; Neubert, E. (2017). Checklist of the land and freshwater Gastropoda of Europe. Last update: July 16th, 2017.
 Sysoev, A. V. & Schileyko, A. A. (2009). Land snails and slugs of Russia and adjacent countries. Sofia/Moskva (Pensoft). 312 pp., 142 plates.
 Schileyko A. A. & Likharev I. M. (1986). Land molluscs of the family Succineidae of the USSR fauna. Trudy zoologicheskogo Museya Moskovskogo Universiteta. 24: 197-239

External links
Succinella oblonga at Animalbase taxonomy,short description, distribution, biology,status (threats), images
Images representing Succinella oblonga at Encyclopedia of Life
 https://www.biodiversitylibrary.org/page/28587765
 Sandberger, C.L.F. (1870-1875). Die Land- und Süßwasser-Conchylien der Vorwelt. C. W. Kreidel, Wiesbaden
 Schileyko, A. A. & Rymzhanov, T. S. (2013). Fauna of land mollusks (Gastropoda, Pulmonata Terrestria) of Kazakhstan and adjacent territories. Moscow-Almaty: KMK Scientific Press. 389 pp

Succineidae
Gastropods described in 1801